The 2009–10 Coca-Cola Tigers season was the 8th season of the franchise in the Philippine Basketball Association (PBA).

Key dates 
 August 2: The 2009 PBA Draft took place in Fort Bonifacio, Taguig.

Draft picks

Roster

Depth chart

Philippine Cup

Eliminations

Standings

Game log

Eliminations 

|- bgcolor="#edbebf"
| 1
| October 16
| Sta. Lucia
| 76-95
| Cabagnot (18)
| Taulava (11)
| Taulava (5)
| Araneta Coliseum
| 0–1
|- bgcolor="#edbebf"
| 2
| October 18
| Barako Bull
| 73-81
| Espino (15)
| Rodriguez (18)
| Cabagnot (5)
| Araneta Coliseum
| 0–2
|- bgcolor="#edbebf"
| 3
| October 23
| Alaska
| 79-100
| Cabagnot (15)
| Cabagnot (8)
| Cabagnot, Cruz (5)
| Cuneta Astrodome
| 0–3
|- bgcolor="#bbffbb"
| 4
| October 30
| Purefoods
| 93-79
| N. Gonzales (17)
| W. Gonzales (7)
| Cabagnot (6)
| Araneta Coliseum
| 1–3

|- bgcolor="#edbebf"
| 5
| November 6
| Smart Gilas*
| 93-98
| 
| 
| 
| Cuneta Astrodome
| 
|- bgcolor="#edbebf"
| 6
| November 11
| Talk 'N Text
| 94-103
| Espino (21)
| Espino (13)
| Espino (4)
| Araneta Coliseum
| 1–4
|- bgcolor="#edbebf"
| 7
| November 18
| Burger King
| 97-106
| Cabagnot (20)
| N. Gonzales (7)
| Cabagnot (5)
| Araneta Coliseum
| 1–5
|- bgcolor="#edbebf"
| 8
| November 21
| San Miguel
| 84-107
| Macapagal (18)
| Espino (8)
| Ross (6)
| Cebu City
| 1–6
|- bgcolor="#edbebf"
| 9
| November 25
| Rain or Shine
| 84-92
| Macapagal (16)
| Rodriguez (13)
| Cabagnot (9)
| Araneta Coliseum
| 1–7
|- bgcolor="#edbebf"
| 10
| November 27
| Barangay Ginebra
| 104-113
| Macapagal (27)
| Cabagnot, Bono (7)
| Cabagnot, Ross (6)
| Ynares Center
| 1–8

|- bgcolor="#edbebf"
| 11
| December 2
| Purefoods
| 79-88
| Rodriguez (21)
| Rodriguez (9)
| Ross (4)
| Araneta Coliseum
| 1–9
|- bgcolor="#edbebf"
| 12
| December 5
| Talk 'N Text
| 104-107
| Macapagal (23)
| Espino (9)
| Cabagnot (4)
| General Santos
| 1–10
|- bgcolor="#edbebf"
| 13
| December 11
| Sta. Lucia
| 92-98
| Cabagnot (15)
| Taulava (10)
| Cabagnot (5)
| Ynares Center
| 1–11
|- bgcolor="#bbffbb"
| 14
| December 13
| Burger King
| 106-94
| Rodriguez (21)
| Espino (11)
| Cabagnot (13)
| Araneta Coliseum
| 2–11
|- bgcolor="#bbffbb"
| 15
| December 20
| Alaska
| 103-92
| Macapagal (19)
| Taulava (12)
| Taulava, Cabagnot (6)
| Araneta Coliseum
| 3–11
|- bgcolor="#edbebf"
| 16
| December 25
| Barangay Ginebra
| 97-106
| Espino (21)
| Taulava (16)
| Cabagnot (7)
| Cuneta Astrodome
| 3–12

|- bgcolor="#bbffbb"
| 17
| January 13
| San Miguel
| 118-107
| Taulava (27)
| Taulava (15)
| Ross (10)
| Araneta Coliseum
| 4–12
|- bgcolor="#bbffbb"
| 18
| January 15
| Rain or Shine
| 105-83
| Ross (18)
| Taulava (14)
| Taulava (8)
| Araneta Coliseum
| 5–12
|- bgcolor="#bbffbb"
| 19
| January 20
| Barako Bull
| 91-89
| Taulava (20)
| Taulava (11)
| Ross (7)
| Cuneta Astrodome
| 6–12

Playoffs 

|- bgcolor="#bbffbb"
| 1
|  January 24
|  Burger King
|  118-112
|  Macapagal (22)
|  Taulava (16)
|  Taulava (7)
|  Ynares Center
|  1–0
|- bgcolor="#edbebf"
| 2
|  January 27
|  Rain or Shine
|  84-99
|  David (20)
|  Taulava (19)
|  Ross (4)
|  Ynares Center
|  1–1

Fiesta Conference

Eliminations

Standings

Game log 

|- bgcolor="#bbffbb"
| 1
| March 24
| Barako
| 97-74
| David (17)
| Taulava (9)
| Rizada (4)
| Araneta Coliseum
| 1–0
|- bgcolor="#bbffbb"
| 2
| March 27
| San Miguel
| 108-98
| David (19)
| Taulava (8)
| Rizada (5)
| Gingoog
| 2–0
|- bgcolor="#bbffbb"
| 3
| March 31
| Air21
| 100-96
| David (21)
| Rizada (8)
| David (4)
| Araneta Coliseum
| 3–0

|- bgcolor="#edbebf"
| 4
| April 4
| Ginebra
| 91-98
| David (25)
| David (8)
| Ross (3)
| Araneta Coliseum
| 3–1
|- bgcolor="#bbffbb"
| 5
| April 14
| Derby Ace
| 79-76
| David (18)
| Taulava (9)
| Lanete (4)
| Araneta Coliseum
| 4–1
|- bgcolor="#edbebf"
| 6
| April 16
| Rain or Shine
| 80-91
| Espino (11)
| Taulava (11)
| Taulava, Cruz, Gonzales (2)
| Araneta Coliseum
| 4–2
|- bgcolor="#edbebf"
| 7
| April 21
| Talk 'N Text
| 91-115
| Lanete (17)
| Taulava (6)
| David (5)
| Araneta Coliseum
| 4–3

|- bgcolor="#edbebf"
| 8
| May 1
| Sta. Lucia
| 94-108
| David (26)
| Taulava (6)
| Lanete (7)
| Cuneta Astrodome
| 4–4
|- bgcolor="#edbebf"
| 9
| May 7
| Alaska
| 103-104
| David (31)
| Taulava (13)
| David, Taulava (3)
| Araneta Coliseum
| 4–5
|- bgcolor="#edbebf"
| 10
| May 14
| Talk 'N Text
| 93-103
| David (21)
| Taulava (13)
| Lanete (5)
| Araneta Coliseum
| 4–6
|- bgcolor="#edbebf"
| 11
| May 19
| Alaska
| 98-108
| David (23)
| Taulava (10)
| Ross (6)
| Araneta Coliseum
| 4–7
|- bgcolor="#edbebf"
| 12
| May 23
| Derby Ace
| 91-104
| David (26)
| Gonzales (9)
| Gonzales, Mendoza (2)
| Araneta Coliseum
| 4–8
|- bgcolor="#bbffbb"
| 13
| May 30
| Barako
| 105-100
| David (25)
| Taulava (14)
| Mendoza (3)
| Araneta Coliseum
| 5–8

|- bgcolor="#edbebf"
| 14
| June 4
| Air21
| 102-104
| David (29)
| Taulava (17)
| Mendoza (6)
| Ninoy Aquino Stadium
| 5–9
|- bgcolor="#bbffbb"
| 15
| June 13
| Ginebra
| 96-95
| David (16)
| Taulava (10)
| Cruz (4)
| Ninoy Aquino Stadium
| 6–9
|- bgcolor="#bbffbb"
| 16
| June 16
| San Miguel
| 89-86
| Taulava (15)
| Cruz (9)
| Cruz (7)
| Araneta Coliseum
| 7–9
|- bgcolor="#bbffbb"
| 17
| June 25
| Sta. Lucia
| 87-76
| David (22)
| Taulava (10)
| Cruz (6)
| AC-tent
| 8–9
|- bgcolor="#edbebf"
| 18
| June 27
| Rain or Shine
| 90-101
| David (16)
| Taulava (18)
| David (6)
| Araneta Coliseum
| 8–10

Locals only

Transactions

Pre-season

Season

Imports recruited

References 

Powerade Tigers seasons
Coca-cola